Original 106 may refer to:

 Original 106 (Aberdeen), an independent radio station broadcasting to Aberdeen and Aberdeenshire in Scotland
 Original 106 (Solent), formerly a radio station broadcasting to the Solent region of southern England
 Original 106.5 (Bristol), formerly a radio station broadcasting to Bristol, England